John Hardgrove (June 24, 1836 – December 18, 1928) was a member of the Wisconsin State Assembly.

Biography
Hardgrove was born on June 24, 1836 in County Clare, Ireland. He moved to Milwaukee, Wisconsin in 1848 and to Forest, Fond du Lac County, Wisconsin in 1851.

On December 8, 1862, Hardgrove married Catherine Heraty in Fond du Lac, Wisconsin. They had twelve children before divorcing in 1897. Following the divorce, Hardgrove moved to Hopkins, Minnesota in 1901. He died on December 18, 1928 in Minneapolis, Minnesota.

Career
Hardgrove was a member of the Assembly in 1883, where he served on the Insurance, Banks, and Banking committee. Additionally, he was Superintendent of Schools and Clerk of Forest. He was a Democrat.

References

External links

People from County Clare
Irish emigrants to the United States (before 1923)
Politicians from Milwaukee
People from Forest, Fond du Lac County, Wisconsin
Democratic Party members of the Wisconsin State Assembly
1836 births
1928 deaths